Safiyeh (also Romanized as Şafīyeh, Şafeyeh, Safīyeh, and Safyeh) is a village in Nayband Rural District, Chah-e Mobarak District, Asaluyeh County, Bushehr Province, Iran. At the 2006 census, its population was 112, in 18 families.

References 

Populated places in Asaluyeh County